Hagai Segal, Chaggai Segal or Haggai Segal is an Israeli convicted terrorist who later became an author and journalist.

In 1980, while part of the group Jewish Underground, Segal planned  and planted a bomb that blew off the leg of a Palestinian mayor. He served a prison sentence and later wrote about his experiences in the book Dear Brothers: The West Bank Jewish Underground. Filmmaker Shai Gal released a documentary in 2017 about the terrorist plots and attacks that took place.

Segal researched the death of Irgun member Yedidya Segal for 15 years and wrote Rak Lo Milhemet Ahim (Just Not Civil War), published by Shilo Barkats in Hebrew (2009).

One of Segal's sons, Amit Segal, is a television news reporter for channel 12 (keshet) (Israeli TV channel).

Bibliography
Dear Brothers: The West Bank Jewish Underground 1988
How My Grandmother Prevented A Civil War, September 1, 2014

References

Living people
Israeli male writers
Israeli journalists
Year of birth missing (living people)
Jewish religious terrorism